Crasnîi Octeabri (Krasnyi Oktiabr) is a commune in the Camenca sub-district of Transnistria, Moldova. It is composed of two villages, Alexandrovca (Александровка) and Crasnîi Octeabri. It has since 1990 been administered as a part of the breakaway Transnistrian Moldovan Republic.

References

Communes of Transnistria
Camenca District